Yaza Dewi was the chief queen consort of King Kyaswa of Pagan. Her personal name was Shin Pwa Oo (ရှင်ဘွားဦး).

References

Bibliography
 
 
 

Chief queens consort of Pagan
13th-century Burmese women